Galician Workers' Party (in Galician: Partido Obreiro Galego) was a political party in Galicia, Spain.

History
POG was founded in October 1977, following a split from the Galician National-Popular Bloc (BN-PG). POG was led by Camilo Nogueira and Xan López Facal. The founders of POG saw autonomy as a first step towards Galician self-rule. POG attracted members from various parties, like Communist Movement of Galicia, Galician Socialist Party, Communist Party of Galicia and Workers Party of Spain. The majority of the membership of the Galician People's Assembly also entered the new party.

At its peak POG had around 200 members, mainly based in Vigo and Santiago de Compostela.

In the 1979 general and municipal elections POG formed part of the coalition Galician Unity (Unidade Galega). In the 1980 plebiscite on the Galician Statute, POG propagated for a blank vote.

In December 1980 the party was reconstructed as Galician Left (Esquerda Galega).

References

Sources
 Manuel Anxo Fernández Baz, A formación do nacionalismo galego contemporáneo (1963-1984), Laiovento, 2003.
 Beramendi, X.G. (2007): De provincia a nación. Historia do galeguismo político. Xerais, Vigo

Defunct socialist parties in Galicia (Spain)
Galician nationalist parties
Left-wing nationalist parties
Marxist parties in Spain